Soveria Mannelli is a town and comune in the province of Catanzaro, in the Calabria region of southern Italy.
 
The town is bordered by Bianchi, Carlopoli, Colosimi, Decollatura, Gimigliano, Pedivigliano.

History
On 30 August 1860, a Sicilian army under General Ghio was disbanded in Soveria Mannelli. This, in the course of the Expedition of the Thousand,  allowed Giuseppe Garibaldi to capture Naples eight days later.

People
 Rosario Rubbettino (1941–2000), publisher, was born in the town.

Sources
 Mario Felice Marasco, Soveria Mannelli e il suo territorio, Notizie e dati tratti dagli appunti di Ivone Sirianni, San Vito al Tagliamento: Tipografia Sanvitese Ellerani, 1969
 Mario Gallo, Soveria Mannelli, Saggi e documentazione storica, Cosenza: Due Emme, 1991

Cities and towns in Calabria